São Paulo do Potengi is a municipality in the state of Rio Grande do Norte in the Northeast region of Brazil.

See also
List of municipalities in Rio Grande do Norte

References

Municipalities in Rio Grande do Norte

The village was elevated to the category of town, under the government of the intervenor Rafael Fernandes Gurjão, through Decree-Law nº 603, of December 31, 1938, being installed on January 1, 1939, with the inauguration of the first sub-mayor, Manoel Henrique de Azevedo.[5]

Its political independence would only be achieved through the intervention of General Antônio Fernandes Dantas, with the creation of the municipality by Decree-Law No. exercise of interventor, and whose installation took place on January 1, 1944, with the inauguration of the first municipal mayor, Severino Raul Gadelha.[5]

The longest-lived of the former mayors was Francisco Cabral, who died at the age of 100. Raul Gadelha was the longest-serving politician as a former mayor, 45 years and 287 days, from 1945 until his death in 1990. José Azevedo was the longest-serving mayor: 16 years, counting his four periods in office. executive, (1989-1992), (1997-2000), (2001-2004) and (2009-2012). Five mayors held office for more than one term: Francisco Cabral took over the executive branch in 1945, leaving office two months later. He was elected mayor in 1948 and governed until 1953, returning to command the municipality from 1958 to 1963; Sebastião Marinho was appointed in 1945, stepping down after five months. He was appointed again in 1946, but he was not compatible with the position in 1947. He was elected mayor in 1953 and governed the municipality until 1958; Geraldo Macêdo ruled from 1983 to 1988 and from 1993 to 1996; José Azevedo, from 1989 to 1992, from 1997 to 2004 (being reelected in 2000), and from 2009 to 2012; and Naldinho Cassimiro from 2005 to 2008 and from 2013 to 2020 (being re-elected in 2016), as he was also the record holder of candidacies for the command of the municipality; He ran for mayor five times in a row.

The position was vacant on only one occasion, being held on a provisional basis by Reinaldo Iglésias for just one day, from June 5 to 6, 1948.